Filatima ukrainica is a moth of the family Gelechiidae. It is found in Gotland, Ukraine, Lithuania and Hungary.

The wingspan is 14–16 mm. The forewings are grey with four dark spots, three of which are ill-defined. Adults are on wing from June to August.

References

Moths described in 1971
Filatima